Qadi Mahalleh (also Romanized as Qādī Maḩalleh) is a village in Siyahrud Rural District, in the Central District of Juybar County, Mazandaran Province, Iran. At the 2006 census, its population was 311, in 87 families.

References 

Populated places in Juybar County